Earl of Wilmington was a title in the Peerage of Great Britain. It was created in 1730 for the politician Spencer Compton, 1st Baron Wilmington, who later served as Prime Minister of Great Britain from 1742 to 1743, during the reign of George II. He had already been created Baron Wilmington in 1728 and was made Viscount Pevensey at the same time as he was given the earldom. Compton was the third son of James Compton, 3rd Earl of Northampton. The titles became extinct on his death in 1743, as he left no male heirs.

The Wilmington title was revived in 1812 when his great-great-nephew Charles Compton, 9th Earl of Northampton, was made Baron Wilmington, Earl Compton and Marquess of Northampton.

The American settlements of Wilmington, Massachusetts, Wilmington, Delaware; Wilmington, Vermont; and Wilmington, North Carolina were named for Spencer Compton, Earl of Wilmington.

Earls of Wilmington (1730)
Spencer Compton, 1st Earl of Wilmington (c. 1674–1743)

See also
Marquess of Northampton
Baron Compton

References

External links

Extinct earldoms in the Peerage of Great Britain
Noble titles created in 1730
Peerages created for the Speaker of the House of Commons